Silent Story is a 2001 film which was written and directed by Eduardo Cisneros. It is a fantasy-comedy/sci-fi film and was released in November 2001. It is rated 7.8 stars on IMDB.

It stars Megahn Perry as Rose and David Fickas as Eddie. The film won Best Short at the Los Angeles Latino International Film Festival in 2001.

References

External links
 

2001 films
2001 short films
2001 comedy films
American comedy short films